Kraus is a surname of German origin. It may also refer to:

 Kraus (musician), New Zealand experimental musician and composer
 Kraus (shoegaze musician), American musician Will Kraus (born 1994/95)
 Kraus Flooring, a Canadian manufacturer
 27049 Kraus, a main-belt asteroid
 Kraus-type radio telescope

See also
 Kraus House, Kirkwood, Missouri, United States, designed by Frank Lloyd Wright, on the National Register of Historic Places
 Kraus Corset Factory, Derby, Connecticut, United States, on the National Register of Historic Places